Martinus (Martin) Op 't Land (born 1959) is a Dutch organizational theorist, consultant and Professor of Enterprise Engineering at the University of Antwerp and at Antwerp Management School, known for his contributions in the field of Enterprise Architecture.

Education
Op 't Land received his Propedeuse in Chemistry in 1979 at the Leiden University, and also his MSc in Mathematics in 1984. Later in 2008 he received his PhD from the Delft University of Technology with a thesis titled "Applying architecture and ontology to the splitting and allying of enterprises" under supervision of Jan Dietz.

Career
Op 't Land started his career as consultant in 1985 at Volmac (acquired by Capgemini in 1992), where he became Principal Consultant and Certified Global Architect. Over the years he has consulted organizations in the field of architecture such as Rijkswaterstaat, NATO Consultation, Command and Control Agency, Radboud University Nijmegen, Air France KLM, HU University of Applied Sciences Utrecht, ICTU (Dutch E-government), and the European Patent Office.

In 2011 he was appointed as Professor of Enterprise Engineering at the Antwerp Management School.

His research interest is in the field of "coherently (re)shaping organisation and information of extended enterprises in splits, mergers and alliances".

Publications 
Op 't Land has authored and co-authored numerous publications in his field of expertise. Books:
 Op 't Land, Martin. Applying Architecture and Ontology to the Splitting and Allying of Enterprises. (2008).
 Op 't Land, Martin, ed. Enterprise Architecture - Creating Value by Informed Governance. (Springer, 2009).

Articles
 Op 't Land, Martin, and Erik Proper. "Impact of Principles on Enterprise Engineering." ECIS. 2007.

References

External links 
 Martin Op 't Land Antwerp Management School
 Martin Op 't Land Universiteit Antwerpen

1959 births
Living people
Dutch business theorists
Enterprise modelling experts
Leiden University alumni
Delft University of Technology alumni
Academic staff of the University of Antwerp
Writers from The Hague